Harry or Harold Alexander is the name of:
Harry Alexander (rugby union) (1879–1915), England rugby union international
Harold Alexander, 1st Earl Alexander of Tunis (1891–1969), British military commander and field marshal
Harold Alexander (footballer) (1902–1964), Australian rules footballer for South Melbourne, also Town Clerk of South Melbourne
Harry Alexander (cricketer) (1905–1993), Australian cricketer
Harry Alexander (footballer) (born 1939), Australian rules footballer for South Melbourne
Harold Alexander (American football) (born 1970), American football player
Harold Alexander (Florida politician) (1900–1987), Florida politician

See also
Henry Alexander (disambiguation)